Kalanchoe mortagei is a species of Kalanchoe (section Bryophyllum) native to northern Madagascar. It is very similar to K. suarezensis, and both of them used to be mistakenly treated as varieties of a totally different species K. poincarei. K. mortagei differs by having auriculate to peltate leaves, while the leaf base of K. suarezensis is attenuate to truncate.

References 

mortagei
mortagei
Endemic flora of Madagascar
Taxa named by Joseph Marie Henry Alfred Perrier de la Bâthie